Ireland competed at the 1960 Summer Olympics in Rome, Italy. 49 competitors, 47 men and 2 women, took part in 39 events in 8 sports.

Athletics

Boxing

Cycling

Five male cyclists represented Ireland in 1960.

Individual road race
 Peter Crinnion
 Sonny Cullen
 Séamus Herron

Sprint
 Martin McKay
 Michael Horgan

1000m time trial
 Michael Horgan

Equestrian

Fencing

Six fencers, five men and one woman, represented Ireland in 1960.

Men's foil
 Brian Hamilton
 Harry Thuillier

Men's épée
 George Carpenter
 Christopher Bland
 Tom Kearney

Men's team épée
 George Carpenter, Christopher Bland, Brian Hamilton, Tom Kearney

Women's foil
 Shirley Armstrong

Sailing

Weightlifting

Wrestling

Men's Light-Heavyweight, Freestyle
Gerry Martina

References

Nations at the 1960 Summer Olympics
1960
1960 in Irish sport